Stephen Nuamah Mensah (born 14 August 1914) is a Ghanaian politician and member of the first parliament of the second republic of Ghana representing Adansi constituency under the membership of the progress party (PP).

Early life and education 
Stephen Mensah was born on 14 August 1914. He attended Bennett College, London where he obtained his Diploma in Secretaryship. He worked as a timber merchant before going into Parliament.

Politics 
Mensah entered parliament in 1969, after winning the Adansi parliamentary seat during the 1969 parliamentary election on the ticket of the Progress Party (PP). During the election, he polled 7,812 votes against Kofi Badu of the National Alliance of Liberals (NAL) who polled 2,292 votes.

Mensah was sworn into the First Parliament of the Second Republic of Ghana on 1 October 1969, after being pronounced winner at the 1969 parliamentary election held on 26 August 1969.

Personal life
Mensah was married with thirteen children, his hobbies were gardening and reading.

References 

1914 births
Possibly living people
Bennett College alumni
Progress Party (Ghana) politicians
Ghanaian MPs 1969–1972
People from Ashanti Region
Ghanaian businesspeople
National Alliance of Liberals politicians